Horse of the Year is an honor given by various organizations worldwide in harness racing and thoroughbred horse racing. 

Some of the awards include:
 American Horse of the Year, also called the Eclipse Award — United States
 Australian Champion Racehorse of the Year
 Canadian Horse of the Year, also called the Sovereign Award for Horse of the Year award — Canada
 European Horse of the Year
 German Horse of the Year — Germany
 Hong Kong Horse of the Year — Hong Kong
 Japanese Horse of the Year — Japan
 New Zealand Horse of the Year — New Zealand
 Equus Award for Horse of the Year — South Africa
 World Thoroughbred Racehorse Rankings, World's Top Ranked Horse

See also
 Horse of the Year Show, annual British indoors horse show